Thiotricha obliquata is a moth of the family Gelechiidae. It was described by Shōnen Matsumura in 1931. It is found in Japan and Russia.

References

Moths described in 1931
Thiotricha